Powder Room is a 2013 British comedy film directed by MJ Delaney and written by Rachel Hirons. It is based on the stage play When Women Wee scripted by Hirons, devised by Natasha Sparkes, Stephanie Jay, Emily Wallis, Amirah Garba, Amy Revelle, Stef O'Driscoll, and Jennifer Davies. The film stars Sheridan Smith, Jaime Winstone, Kate Nash, and Oona Castilla Chaplin.

Plot
The comedy follows Sam, as her life is turned upside down on a big night out. When reunited with her old college friends, Sam is forced to re-evaluate her life and constructs an elaborate façade in order to convince herself and her friends that she has it all. But once her dysfunctional yet devoted trio of best mates intervene, her carefully crafted charade begins to crumble amidst the shots, cigarettes, ciders and toilet transgressions. Faced with some very harsh realities, Sam must struggle to remain true to herself and reassess exactly what she wants from life.

The film tells its story in a series of vignettes showing conversations held in the powder room of a nightclub. The story was partly inspired by a clubbing trip on which Hirons overheard two women talking candidly about anal sex in a cubicle of a women's toilet.

Cast
 Sheridan Smith as Sam
 Jaime Winstone as Chanel
 Kate Nash as Michelle
 Oona Chaplin as Jess
 Riann Steele as Paige
 Alice Sanders as Mel
 Sarah Hoare as Saskia
 Johnnie Fiori as Toilet attendant
 Micah Balfour as James
 Alex Warren as Sean
 Zara White as Stacey
 Antonia Bernath as Kim
 Jodi Halpin as Linzi
 Bunmi Mojekwu as Louise
 Lashana Lynch as Laura
 Elarica Gallacher as Jenny
 Stephanie Jay as Alex
 Natasha Sparkes as Bunny
 Emily Wallis as Helena

Production

Damian Jones decided to take the play from stage to screen after watching the cast of five young actresses Emily Wallis, Amirah Garba, Stephanie Jay, Natasha Sparkes, and Amy Revelle on stage at The Soho Theatre, playing up to six different characters each in various sketches in the provocative comedy, which had transferred from The Edinburgh Fringe Festival.

Principal photography commenced on 29 November 2012 at 3 Mills Studios in London, and was also filmed in locations in Holloway, London.

Music
Music for the film was curated by the all-female, five-piece rock band, Fake Club. The band appeared in the film, performing music of their own writing, including some songs created specifically for the film. Fake Club members were also responsible for the selection of all other tracks used in the film.  The soundtrack also features the track 'Pretty Colours' by London-based, Swedish band FRANCOBOLLO which first appeared in their debut e.p HARPHOLMA.

References

External links
 
 

2013 films
2010s female buddy films
2010s buddy comedy films
2013 independent films
British buddy comedy films
British female buddy films
British independent films
2010s English-language films
Vertigo Films films
British films based on plays
Films shot in London
2013 comedy films
2010s British films